Lt. Col. (R) Younus Changezi (born 4 November 1944) is a politician from Baluchistan, Pakistan and a former football player. He belongs to the minority Hazara community. He served in the army for a long period of time, and also served in the 1971 war as a captain.

Education
Younus Changezi acquired his high school education from Cadet College Petaro, where he studied from 1966–1968 and completed his Intermediate. While in school, he was given the nickname of "Tarzan" and has been known by this name all along.

Sports
While he was still at Cadet College Petaro, Changezi was chosen to be a part of the Pakistan national football team.

In later years, he remained the coach of the national football team.

Military career
After high school, Changezi joined the Pakistan Army, from where he retired as a lieutenant colonel. He served the army for nearly 25 years.

Political career
Changezi won the provincial elections in 2002 as an independent candidate, and became a Member of the Provincial Assembly of Balochistan. Upon his victory, he decided to join the pro-Pervez Musharraf Pakistan Muslim League (Q). As a member of the government, he was appointed the Provincial Minister for Environment, Forests, and Sports. He remained in this position until 2007.

Changezi lost his seat in the Provincial Assembly of Balochistan during the 2008 elections due to the tide against the pro-Pervez Musharraf political parties.

See also
List of Pakistanis
Cadet College Petaro

References

External links
 

1944 births
Cadet College Petaro alumni
Pakistani people of Hazara descent
Hazara military personnel
Pakistani footballers
Pakistan international footballers
Pakistan Muslim League (Q) politicians
Living people
Pakistan Army officers
Pakistani Shia Muslims
People from Quetta
Association footballers not categorized by position
Pakistani football managers
Pakistan national football team managers